Vaterländischer Künstlerverein was a collaborative musical publication or anthology, incorporating 83 variations for piano on a theme by Anton Diabelli, written by 51 composers living in or associated with Austria.  It was published in two parts in 1823 and 1824, by firms headed by Diabelli.  It includes Ludwig van Beethoven's Diabelli Variations, Op. 120 (a set of 33 variations), as well as single variations from 50 other composers including Carl Czerny, Franz Schubert, Johann Nepomuk Hummel, Ignaz Moscheles, Friedrich Kalkbrenner, Franz Liszt (aged only 12 at the time of publication), and a host of lesser-known names including Franz Xaver Wolfgang Mozart and others now largely forgotten. 

Vaterländischer Künstlerverein has various translations, including "Patriotic Artists' Association", "Art Association of the Fatherland", "Patriotic Culture Club", "Fatherland's Society of Artists", "National Artists' Association", "Native Artist's Association" and "Native Society of Artists".

Background

In 1819, the Viennese publishing house of Cappi & Diabelli invited a number of Austrian composers to contribute one variation each for the piano, on a theme written by Anton Diabelli himself, one of the principals of the firm.  Diabelli's theme is usually described as a waltz, but in form it has more of the character of a Ländler. Carl Czerny was asked to also provide a coda as a suitable way of rounding out the collection.  Ludwig van Beethoven exceeded his brief by writing no less than 33 variations, and entered into negotiations with Diabelli to have his set published separately from the others.  Beethoven's first biographer Anton Schindler wrote that the project was first devised in the winter of 1822-23, but this is an error, as Czerny's manuscript is dated 7 May 1819 and Franz Schubert's variation is known to have been written in March 1821.  Czerny's was the earliest variation to be written and, as he also wrote the coda, it is likely that Diabelli involved him in the project from the very beginning.  It is also likely that the invitations were sent not long before Czerny's contributions were written (May 1819), but certainly no later.

It is not known exactly what lay behind this project, other than perhaps a simple act of self-promotion, either for the firm or for Diabelli himself.  The combined contributions were published as Vaterländischer Künstlerverein, in two parts.  Part I was published by Cappi & Diabelli in June 1823, and consisted of Beethoven's 33 variations (now known as the Diabelli Variations, Op. 120), with a dedication to Mme Antonie von Brentano.  By the time the second part was published, the two principals, Diabelli and Pietro Cappi had parted company, and Diabelli had joined with Anton Spina and renamed the firm Diabelli & Co.  Part II was published in late 1823 or early 1824 by Diabelli & Co., and includes the other 50 variations and Czerny's coda.

It is also not known how many composers were approached, but 51 responded to the invitation.  Some well-known names such as Ignaz von Seyfried and Joseph Weigl do not appear.  Whether they were not interested in participating or whether they were not even approached is not known.

Leaving Beethoven's 33 variations to one side, 48 of the other 50 composers wrote only the one variation they were asked for.  Franz Xaver Wolfgang Mozart and Gottfried Rieger wrote two variations each, but only one from each of them was originally published.

Part I, by Beethoven

Ludwig van Beethoven's Diabelli Variations, his last major piano work, is part of the keyboard music canon and is by far the better known volume. It is frequently performed and recorded to this day.

Part II, by various composers
The composers of Part II include some names still notable today, but most of them have been forgotten.  The variations were numbered in strictly alphabetical order according to the then current spelling conventions. The full list follows:

Note: Some of the composers gave no tempo indication, and they can be assumed to be played Vivace, as in the original theme.

Recordings and performances
Beethoven's Diabelli Variations have been recorded and performed innumerable times.

The remainder of Vaterländischer Künstlerverein has received very little attention since its publication.  The complete set has been recorded by Rudolf Buchbinder and Doris Adam.  Ian Fountain has recorded a selection of thirty-three of the variations (resequenced based on the order in which he performed them during a Berlin concert), preceded by Diabelli's theme and concluding with Czerny's coda. Martha Argerich has performed excerpts in concert. In 2009 Professor Peter Roennfeldt performed the complete set in Brisbane, Australia.

Sources
 Eric Blom (ed.), Grove's Dictionary of Music and Musicians, 5th ed. (1954), Vol. VIII, pp. 690–692 
 Naxos

References 

Collaborations in classical music
Compositions for solo piano
Compositions in C major
Variations
Piano variations by Ludwig van Beethoven
Compositions by Carl Czerny
Compositions by Johann Nepomuk Hummel
Compositions by Franz Liszt
Piano music by Franz Schubert
1819 compositions
1823 compositions
1824 compositions